The So Nice Tour is the fourth concert tour by Canadian recording artist Carly Rae Jepsen. Launched in support of her sixth studio album The Loneliest Time (2022), The tour began in September 24, 2022 and is scheduled to end March 14, 2023. The tour will play 49 shows in North America, Europe, Asia and Australia

Background
The tour was announced June 2022, shortly after Jepsen released the album's first single, "Western Wind". It became her first set of concerts since 2019. It was set to begin 24 May 2022 in Montreal, Canada. Before the official announcement, it was released Jepsen would perform two co-headlining shows with Bleachers. Those shows took place in Cleveland and Toronto.

Jepsen aligned with PLUS1 to have one dollar from all shows (in North America) donated to The Ally Coalition. This organization supports homeless and at-risk LGBTQ youth. In October 2022, shows were revealed in the United Kingdom, Ireland and Australia.

Critical reception
Reviews for the concerts in America have been positive. Many critics noted Jepsen's showmanship and exuberant energy during the shows. For the concert in Boston, Abigail A. Golden (The Harvard Crimson) writes Jepsen was a "joy to watch". She continues, "With a 27-song setlist, Jepsen's stamina was commendable. In leaping across the stage, trekking up flights of stairs to engage with the members of her band, and coordinating dances with backup vocalists Sophi Bairley and Julia Ross, the singer kept the energy up throughout her entire performance."

Moving to Philadelphia, Maureen Walsh (WXPN) states she enjoyed how the music was the main attraction of the show. She wrote, "All night, I kept looking around seeing people singing along, having a great time and losing themselves dancing to some fun freaking music. Carly's moonlady animation was right: forget your cares and enjoy yourself every once in a while, it will do you a world of good."

For the concert in Los Angeles, Jefferson Lim (Annenberg Media) says the performance "radiated energy". He says, "The nearly 90-minute show was an unforgettable, energetic night of fun. Jepsen performed non-stop with such vigor and passion that it was just too hard not to dance and sing along. If love is a lonely road, then we can rest easy knowing that we have the comfort of Jepsen's music to go along with it."

Setlist

North American setlist

The following setlist was performed during the concert held on 12 October 2022, at the Mission Ballroom, in Denver, Colorado. It is not intended to represent all concerts for the duration of the tour.

 "This Love Isn't Crazy"
 "Let's Sort the Whole Thing Out"
 "Run Away With Me"
 "Too Much"
 "Talking to Yourself"
 "Julien"
 "Warm Blood"
 "Emotion" / "Favourite Colour"
 "Call Me Maybe"
 "Stay Away"
 "Comeback"
 "Western Wind"
 "I Really Like You"
 "Want You in My Room"
 "Now That I Found You"
 "Your Type"
 "For Sure"
 "Go Find Yourself or Whatever"
 "Beach House"
 "Boy Problems" / "Fake Mona Lisa"
 "Cry"
 "The Loneliest Time"
 "When I Needed You"
Encore
 "I Didn't Just Come Here to Dance"
 "All That"
 "Cut to the Feeling"

European setlist
The following setlist was performed during the concert held on 4 February 2023, at the Olympia Theatre, Dublin, Ireland. It is not intended to represent all concerts for the duration of the European leg of the tour.

Act I
 "Surrender My Heart"
 "Summer Love"
 "Run Away with Me"
 "Talking to Yourself"
 "Too Much"
 "Julien"
 "Bends"
 "Western Wind"
 "Bad Thing Twice"
 "Emotion"
 "Favourite Colour"
 "Call Me Maybe"
 "Stay Away"
 "For Sure"
Act II
  "So Nice"
 "I Really Like You"
 "Want You in My Room"
 "Shooting Star"
 "Now That I Found You"
 "Move Me" (with Lewis OfMan)
 "Go Find Yourself or Whatever"
 "Beach House"
 "When I Needed You"
Encore
 "I Didn't Just Come Here to Dance"
 "The Loneliest Time"
 "Cut to the Feeling"

Asian setlist
The following setlist was performed during the concert held on 4 March 2023, at the Filinvest City Event Grounds, Muntinlupa, Philippines. It is not intended to represent all concerts for the duration of the Asian leg of the tour.

Act I
 "Surrender My Heart"
 "Joshua Tree
 "Run Away with Me"
 "Too Much"
 "Julien"
 "Talking to Yourself"
 "Emotion"
 "Favourite Colour"
 "Call Me Maybe"
 "Stay Away"
 "Bad Thing Twice"
 "Western Wind"
Act II
  "So Nice"
 "I Really Like You"
 "Want You in My Room"
 "Your Type"
 "Boy Problems"
 "Now That I Found You"
 "I Didn't Just Come Here To Dance"
 "The Loneliest Time"
 "When I Needed You"
Encore
  "Go Find Yourself or Whatever"
 "Beach House"
 "Cut to the Feeling"

Shows

Notes

References

2022 concert tours
2023 concert tours
Carly Rae Jepsen concert tours
Concert tours of North America
Concert tours of the United States
Concert tours of Canada